Mary-Lou Piatek defeated Alycia Moulton in the final, 6–1, 6–3 to win the girls' singles tennis title at the 1979 Wimbledon Championships.

Seeds

  Andrea Jaeger (quarterfinals)
  Lena Sandin (third round)
  Mary-Lou Piatek (champion)
  Linda Siegel (second round)
  Alycia Moulton (final)
  Helga Lütten (quarterfinals)
  Susan Leo (semifinals)
  Claudia Kohde (third round)

Draw

Finals

Top half

Section 1

Section 2

Bottom half

Section 3

Section 4

References

External links

Girls' Singles
Wimbledon Championship by year – Girls' singles
Wimb